"Come to Life" is a song by American rapper Kanye West from his tenth studio album, Donda (2021). An accompanying music video was released on September 2, 2021. The video sees West being set on fire during the album's Soldier Field listening party, before he reunites with Kim Kardashian once he has been extinguished. In October 2021, West performed the song at a wedding reception in Venice.

The version of the song featured on the deluxe version of Donda, released November 14, 2021, slightly differs in that it features background vocals from fellow American rapper Tyler, the Creator during the chorus.

Release and promotion
On August 29, 2021, "Come to Life" was included as the 22nd track on West's 10th studio album Donda. A music video for the song was released on September 2, 2021. The video features footage from the album's third public listening event at Soldier Field in Chicago on August 26, capturing West getting set on fire while sitting in a replica of his childhood home and wearing protective gear. The home is also set alight, accompanied by onlookers watching the scene. West then stands up and walks out, though remains covered in flames, before he is extinguished. The rapper's wife Kim Kardashian slowly approaches the center of the stadium as she wears a Balenciaga wedding dress, reuniting with him for the video's conclusion. Varietys Jem Aswad named West setting on fire and reuniting with Kardashian as "two of the more remarkable scenes" of the event, while Laura Harding of the Irish Independent depicted the rapper as being "engulfed" by fire. At Vulture, Bethy Squires compared West setting alight to the house in the film Badlands (1973) and the main character of the essays When You Are Engulfed in Flames (2008). On October 16, 2021, West performed "Come to Life" as part of his four-song set at the wedding reception for Tiffany & Co. executive Alexandre Arnault and D'estree founder Geralde Guyot in Venice, Italy. During the performance, he wore a Halloween mask and a large suit jacket.

Variety named it the 11th best song of 2021.

Charts

Weekly charts

Year-end charts

References

2021 songs
Kanye West songs
Song recordings produced by Warryn Campbell
Song recordings produced by Jeff Bhasker
Song recordings produced by Kanye West
Songs written by Jeff Bhasker
Songs written by Kanye West
Songs written by Warryn Campbell
Song recordings produced by Mike Dean (record producer)